"All the Pretty Girls" is a song by Australian singer songwriter Vera Blue, released in October 2018 as the lead single from her forthcoming third studio album. The music video was directed by Jared Daperis and released on 29 November 2018. "All the Pretty Girls" was certified platinum in Australia in January 2020.

Upon release, Vera Blue told Triple J that she channelled Fleetwood Mac while writing the tune in Los Angeles adding "It's a cheeky play on stereotypes; the whole idea of judging a book by its cover. It's kind of cruel and not really my vibe, but when you like someone or attracted to someone you're like 'ooh, ok that person looks like they're a player-heartbreaker; makes all the girls cry'. All the pretty girls meaning all girls in general because all girls are pretty."

Reception
Al Newstead from Triple J called the song a "summery single that continues the empowerment messaging of 'Lady Powers'". Matthew Kent from The Line of Best Fit said "'All the Pretty Girls' merges a folk-inspired innoncence  and naiveté that is masked by the crescendo of modern influences that come into play." adding "the dreamy, guitar-strum-led production plays off against Blue's crystalline vocals."

Track listing 
Digital download

Charts

Certifications

Release history

References 

2018 songs
2018 singles
Vera Blue songs
Universal Music Australia singles